The 1995–96 Slovenian PrvaLiga was the fifth season of Slovenian top division football. The season started on 30 July 1995 and ended on 8 June 1996 with each team playing a total of 36 matches.

League table

Relegation play-offs

Korotan Prevalje won 3–1 on aggregate.

Results
Every team plays four times against their opponents, twice at home and twice on the road, for a total of 36 matches.

First half of the season

Second half of the season

Top goalscorers

See also
1995 Slovenian Supercup
1995–96 Slovenian Football Cup
1995–96 Slovenian Second League

References
General

External links
Official website of the PrvaLiga 

Slovenian PrvaLiga seasons
Slovenia
1995–96 in Slovenian football